Haripada Bharati (also known as "Master Mosai")who  was the West bengal who served as a first president of Bharatiya Janata Party, West Bengal. In 1977 he was elected MLA from Jorabagan Assembly Constituency as a Janata Party candidate. He was also the Principal of Narasinha Dutt College, Howrah.

Political career
He contested the General election of 1967 as Bharatiya Jana Sangh candidate from Calcutta North West and got 82,455 (21.08%) votes. In General election of 1971 he again contested as an independent candidate from the same constituency and got around 34,397 (21.08%) votes. In the year 1980, he again contested from Jadavpur as Janata Party candidate and got 31846 votes.

References

West Bengal MLAs 1977–1982
Bharatiya Jana Sangh politicians
Bharatiya Janata Party politicians from West Bengal
People from Kolkata
Year of birth missing (living people)
Janata Party politicians